Yelgoi (Telugu:ఎల్గోయి) is a village located in Telangana state Sangareddy district Manoor mandal. It is located 10 Km range from the Mandal headquarters manoor.

Statistical Details 
According to the 2011 Indian Census, the village is spread over 2190 hectares with 338 houses and a population of 1784. The number of males in the village is 931, the number of females is 853. The number of scheduled castes is 246 while the number of scheduled tribes is 73.

Nearby Villages 
Pulkurthi, Gudur, Morgi, Davoor

Education Facilities 
The Village has a government school for  kinder garden to class tenth.

References 

Villages in Sangareddy district